Benjamin Warren Couch (August 19, 1873 – November 4, 1945) was a New Hampshire lawyer and politician.

Biography
Benjamin Warren Couch was born in Concord, New Hampshire on August 19, 1873. He was educated at Concord High School, Dartmouth College and Harvard Law School. He then practiced law, eventually becoming a member of the firm of Stevens, Couch and Stevens. A Republican, he served in various local positions in Concord. In 1911 he was elected to the state legislature, where he was chairman of the judiciary committee.

He died in Concord on November 4, 1945.

References

1873 births
1945 deaths
New Hampshire Republicans
Dartmouth College alumni
Harvard Law School alumni
Politicians from Concord, New Hampshire